West Virginia Route 47 is an east–west state highway in northern West Virginia. The western terminus of the route is at WV 618 (former US 50) in Parkersburg. The eastern terminus is at U.S. Route 33 and U.S. Route 119 in Linn.


Major intersections

See also
 List of state highways in West Virginia
 List of highways numbered 47

References

External links

047
Transportation in Wood County, West Virginia
Transportation in Wirt County, West Virginia
Transportation in Ritchie County, West Virginia
Transportation in Gilmer County, West Virginia